Pain Semes Kandeh (also Romanized as Pā’īn Semes Kandeh; also known as Samaskandeh, Sam Kandeh, Semes Kandeh, and Semes Kandeh-ye Pā’īn) is a village in Miandorud-e Kuchak Rural District, in the Central District of Sari County, Mazandaran Province, Iran. At the 2006 census, its population was 154, in 41 families.

References 

Populated places in Sari County